UMTS Forum is an open cross sector and independent organization founded on 16 December 1996
in Zürich, Switzerland, as a non-profit association under Swiss law with the aim to enhance the modular
3G/UMTS concept, which takes full regard of the trend of convergence of existing and future information
networks, devices and services, and the potential synergies that can be derived from such convergence.

Following successful global implementation of UMTS, focus changed to upgrades and evolution of UMTS. Currently mobile operators are implementing HSPA (High Speed Packet Access), which will be followed by LTE (Long Term Evolution). This change is also reflected in activities of UMTS Forum.

UMTS Forum is very active in different standardization and regulation organizations like ITU, ETSI/3GPP, EC and CEPT (European Conference of Postal and Telecommunications Administrations.

Steering Group 
 Jean-Pierre Bienaimé, Chairman
 Thomas Sidenbladh, Vice Chairman
 Guillaume Lebrun, Spectrum Aspects Group Chairman
 Cengiz Evci, Chairman Manufacturers Group
 Peter Zidar, Chairman Operators Group
 Werner Wiedermann, Vice Chairman Operators Group
 Adrian Scrase, ETSI Observer

References 
 UMTS Forum
 UMTS Forum's Steering Group

Organizations established in 1996
UMTS